Gonanticlea ochreivittata is a moth of the family Geometridae first described by Max Bastelberger in 1909. It is found in China and Taiwan.

Subspecies
Gonanticlea ochreivittata ochreivittata
Gonanticlea ochreivittata yunnanensis Prout, 1939

References

Moths described in 1909
Larentiinae